XHLUPE-FM is a radio station on 105.3 FM in Monterrey, Nuevo León, Mexico. It is owned by Multimedios Radio and carries an variety hits format known as La Lupe. The transmitter is located atop Cerro de la Silla.

History
XHLUPE received its concession as XHPAG-FM on September 29, 1991. The original location of the station, known as "Papagayos FM", was in Los Ramones, with the transmitter in the Sierra Papagayos range to the northeast of town.

It was later known as "La Más Buena" and "105.3, La Que Te Complace" before changing to the La Lupe moniker in 2017. The XHLUPE-FM call sign was adopted in 2020.

References

Radio stations established in 1991
Radio stations in Monterrey
Multimedios Radio